The Hill Farming Act 1946 is an Act of the Parliament of the United Kingdom. It was passed during the Labour government of Clement Attlee. This Act aimed to encourage the expansion of pastoral farming and made grants available for improving upland farms.

Notes

United Kingdom Acts of Parliament 1946
Agriculture legislation in the United Kingdom